Balakirev The Buffoon is a 2002 Russian televised version of 1999 Lenkom theatrical 
presentation, written by Grigori Gorin.
Theatrical version directed by Mark Zakharov, televised version by Nikolay Skuyibin.

Plot 
Buffoon of the court circle, Ivan Balakirev, is a constant participant of the Tzar's festivities and buffoonery. Under the will of the circumstances he was drawn into the intricate relations inside the court and inside the royal family...

Cast 
 Oleg Yankovsky, Aleksandr Lazarev jr. as Peter The Great
 Sergei Frolov as Ivan Balakirev
 Aleksandra Zakharova, Maria Mironova as Catherine I of Russia
 Aleksandr Lazarev jr. as Willem Mons
 Aleksandr Zbruyev as Count Yaguzhinskii, chief prosecutor
 Nikolai Karachentsov, Viktor Rakov as Alexander Menshikov
 Olesya Zheleznyak as Dunya Burykina
 Yuri Kolychev  as Peter Shafirov
 Tatyana Kravchenko as Anisya Kirillovna Balakireva
 Lyudmila Artemyeva as Darya Burykina
  Lyudmila Porgina  as Golovkina, chamber-maid
  Igor Fokin as Shapsky, chief jester

Balakirev in reality 
Based on a real story set time in a Peter The Great era.

Ivan Alexandrovich Balakirev was a trusted servant of Peter I and Catherine I since 1699. In the time of the empress Anne he became an official court buffoon.

One of the version around the Balakirev surname etymology is that it formed from Bala kire, a tatar for stubborn kid.

Ksenofont Polevoy published a book entitled Collection of anecdotes by Balakirev, using the real name of Ivan Balakirev as his pseudonym. It's in fact a collection from various people and sources.

References

External links
 
 Афиша СПб

2002 television films
2002 films
Films directed by Mark Zakharov
2000s Russian-language films
Russian television films
2002 comedy films